Shali or Shalli may refer to:

Places
Shali, Afghanistan, an inhabited locality in Afghanistan
Shali, Bhutan, an inhabited locality in Bhutan
Shali, Egypt, medieval city ruins in Egypt
Shali, East Azerbaijan, a village in East Azerbaijan Province, Iran
Shali, Kohgiluyeh and Boyer-Ahmad, a village in Kohgiluyeh and Boyer-Ahmad Province, Iran
Shali, Chechen Republic, a town in Shalinsky District of the Chechen Republic in Russia
Shali, Republic of Tatarstan, a rural selo in Pestrechinsky District of the Republic of Tatarstan in Russia
Shali River, a river on which the census town of Beliatore in India stands

People
Shali Shen, researcher who first isolated the HEPACAM gene
Sally Chen (born 1948), actress playing Tian's mother in Dark Tales, a Hong Kong television drama
Yu Sha-li, who played Shagu in The Brave Archer 2, a 1978 Hong Kong movie

Characters
Shali, alternative name of Shalia, a character from The World God Only Knows manga

See also
 Sali (disambiguation)
 Shalinsky (disambiguation)